Śmiłowo may refer to the following places:
Śmiłowo, Gostyń County in Greater Poland Voivodeship (west-central Poland)
Śmiłowo, Kuyavian-Pomeranian Voivodeship (north-central Poland)
Śmiłowo, Masovian Voivodeship (east-central Poland)
Śmiłowo, Piła County in Greater Poland Voivodeship (west-central Poland)
Śmiłowo, Szamotuły County in Greater Poland Voivodeship (west-central Poland)